The IWRG Rey del Ring (Spanish for "King of the Ring") refers both to an annual tournament and a professional wrestling championship promoted by the Mexican Lucha libre professional wrestling promotion International Wrestling Revolution Group (IWRG). From 2002 until 2011 the IWRG Rey del Ring only referred to an annual 30-man tournament, but as of the 2011 tournament there is also a physical championship belt that is and can be defended throughout the year.

As it is a professional wrestling championship, the championship was not won not by actual competition, but by a scripted ending to a match determined by the bookers and match makers. On occasion the promotion declares a championship vacant, which means there is no champion at that point in time. This can either be due to a storyline, or real life issues such as a champion suffering an injury being unable to defend the championship, or leaving the company.

Rey del Ring tournament
Originally the Rey del Ring tournament was a 30-man elimination match, starting with four wrestlers in the ring, then when a wrestler was eliminated through pinfall, submission, count out or disqualification another participant was added until 29 men had been eliminated. In 2008 IWRG changed the format to be more like World Wrestling Entertainment's Royal Rumble match; two men start in the ring and a new wrestler joins the match at a specific time interval. Unlike the Royal Rumble throwing a wrestler out of the ring did not result in elimination. The first tournament, the 2002 Rey del Ring  was held on June 6, 2002, in IWRG's primary arena, Arena Naucalpan in Naucalpan, State of Mexico, Mexico. The tournament was won by Último Vampiro when he eliminated Bombero Infernal as the last participant. In 2004 the winner of that year's Rey del Ring tournament was also awarded the vacant IWRG Intercontinental Middleweight Championship; the match saw Fantasy eliminate Avisman as the last participant to win the tournament and the championship. Cerebro Negro won both the 2005 and 2006 tournaments, making him the only person to win the tournament twice. In 2007 the Rey del Ring was won by Yamato, the first non-Mexican to win the tournament. Yamato worked for IWRG through a deal struck with Japanese wrestling promotion All Japan Pro Wrestling (AJPW) that allowed AJPW to send young wrestlers to Mexico to gain in-ring experience. The 2008 Rey del Ring was won by Scorpio, Jr. while the 2009 Rey del Ring tournament was won by Puerto Rican Ricky Cruzz. The two Rey del Ring winners would later team up to win the IWRG Intercontinental Tag Team Championship from Los Junior Dinamitas (El Hijo de Cien Caras and Máscara Año 2000, Jr.). IWRG did not hold a Rey del Ring tournament in 2010 and never gave an official explanation as to why not. In 2011 IWRG introduced the Rey del Ring Championship to be awarded to the winner of the 2011 Rey del Ring tournament winner El Pantera. Pantera would vacate the Championship on the date of the 2012 Rey del Ring tournament, allowing tournament winner Oficial Factor to become the new champion as well.  After Oficial 911 won the 2013 Rey del Ring tournament Oficial Factor handed over the championship belt to 911.

Rey del Ring Championship
El Pantera became the first ever Rey del Ring Champion as a result of winning the 2011 Rey del Ring tournament on June 16, 2011 when he eliminated Último Gladiador as the last tournament participant. He was awarded with an actual championship belt, to be work for IWRG matches and defended when appropriate between tournaments. Pantera made the first ever championship defense on July 10, 2011 when he successfully defeated Último Gladiador to retain the championship. The championship was vacated for the 2012 Rey del Ring tournament so that the winner of the tournament could become the new Rey del Ring Champion at the same time. Oficial Factor won the tournament, lastly eliminating Hijo del Pirata Morgan to win the Championship. on August 12, 2012 Hijo del Pirata Morgan became the first person to win the Rey del Ring Championship outside of the tournament when he defeated Oficial Factor. He held the championship for a total of 42 days, until September 23, 2012 when Oficial Factor regained the championship. Factor won the title in a Relevos Suicidas match that also included Trauma I and Mascara Ano 2000 Jr., and as a result of his victory Factor also won the IWRG Junior de Juniors Championship from Hijo del Pirata Morgan.

Rey del Ring Tournament winners

Rey del Ring Championship history

Combined reigns

Rey del Ring (2002)

The very first Rey del Ring tournament was held on April 21, 2002, produced and scripted by IWRG and held in Arena Naucalpan. While most of the match results are known, sources are unclear on who competed in the Rey del Ring Torneo Cibernetico'' match, only recording that Bombero Infernal won the match.

Results

Rey del Ring (2004)

The 2004 Rey del Ring''' show was a Mexican lucha libre, or professional wrestling supercard show held March 18, 2004. The show was produced and scripted by International Wrestling Revolution Group (IWRG) and was held in Arena Naucalpan, IWRG's main venue, located Naucalpan, State of Mexico, Mexico. The show marked the second time IWRG hed a ""Rey del Ring" ("King of the Ring") and it would later grow into an annual tradition. Due to minimal record keeping for professional wrestling the full show results are not known. It is only known that Fantasy won the "Rey del Ring" tournament, and as a result won the vacant IWRG Intercontinental Middleweight Championship as a result.

Results

Footnotes

References

External links
 IWRG Junior de Juniors Championship

 
International Wrestling Revolution Group championships